English Attack can refer to:

Chess openings 
 Sicilian Defence, Najdorf Variation (1. e4 c5 2. Nf3 d6 3. d4 cxd4 4. Nxd4 Nf6 5. Nc3 a6 6. Be3)
 Sicilian Defence, Scheveningen Variation (1. e4 c5 2. Nf3 d6 3. d4 cxd4 4. Nxd4 Nf6 5. Nc3 e6 6. Be3 a6 7. Qd2 or 7.f3)

Military battles 
 Battle of Quebec (1690)
 Attack on Mers-el-Kébir